Austin–Magie Farm and Mill District is a registered historic district near Oxford, Ohio, listed in the National Register on December 21, 1982.  It contains 5 contributing buildings.

The farm, mill site and millrace are significant as they represent the intensive nineteenth century agricultural and processing activities in Butler County, Ohio. Between 1815–1916, the Austin–Pugh mills were an integral component of this area's industry and commerce. The main farmhouse, built 1841, is a solid embodiment of rural vernacular architecture, and the associated outbuildings enhance the agrarian setting. The limestone mill foundation and mile-long mill race are tangible evidence of Oxford Township's largest mill complex. Aaron Austin, builder of the house, and mill owned the property from 1815–1863.

Subsequently, the property was acquired by David M. Magie, one of Ohio's most prominent stock farmers and swine breeders. As early as 1837 Magie had earned a reputation for his superior breed of swine. These large, well proportioned hogs, forerunners of the Poland China breed, were widely known as the "Magie Breed." Many agrarian historians consider the Poland China hog Ohio's greatest contribution to the breeding of fine livestock in the United States.

Historic uses 
Single Dwelling
Animal Facility
Manufacturing Facility

References 

National Register of Historic Places in Butler County, Ohio
Historic districts on the National Register of Historic Places in Ohio
Geography of Butler County, Ohio
Farms on the National Register of Historic Places in Ohio